Cerceris elegans is a species of wasp in the family Crabronidae. It is found in Russia.

References

External links 

 

Crabronidae
Insects described in 1849
Fauna of Russia